The history of Freeways in Iran goes back to 35 years ago. The first freeway in Iran, Freeway 2 was built before the revolution, between Tehran and Karaj. The construction of Tehran-Qom Freeway was started and the studies of many freeways today started before the revolution. The total AADT of the system is 144 Million vehicles.

Numbered List

Freeway 1

Freeway 2

Freeway 3

Freeway 5

Freeway 6

Freeway 7

Freeway 9

Freeway 16 (Iran)

Zobahan

Freeways under construction

References

 
Iran transport-related lists
Iran
Roads in Iran